The Dominators is the first serial of the sixth season of the British science fiction television series Doctor Who, which originally aired in five weekly parts from 10 August to 7 September 1968.

In the serial, the Second Doctor (Patrick Troughton) and his travelling companions Jamie McCrimmon (Frazer Hines) and Zoe Heriot (Wendy Padbury) work with the Dulcians of the planet Dulkis to prevent the alien Dominators from blowing up Dulkis and using its irradiated remains as spaceship fuel.

Plot

An alien craft bearing the ruthless Dominators arrives on the peaceful planet of Dulkis. The craft lands on the Island of Death, a nuclear test site housing an anti-war museum, and soon absorbs all the radiation on the island. The robotic Quarks are sent out by the Dominators to prepare boreholes into the planet’s crust in order to convert the planet into rocket fuel. Toba uses the Quarks to fire on and kill three adventure seekers who stumble across his project. Their pilot Cully, however, survives by hiding, though the craft that brought him to the island is destroyed. Rago is furious that these potential slaves have been wasted.

The TARDIS arrives on another part of the island and the Doctor and his companions Jamie and Zoe hear the explosion of the craft being destroyed. They take shelter in the museum and meet three other newly arrived Dulcians, Educator Balan and his young charges Teel and Kando. All are puzzled that the radiation reading on the Island is nil, since it should be radioactive after the nuclear explosion 172 years earlier. Cully arrives too, and tells them about the murderous Dominators and their robots. Balan does not accept this: Cully, the son of the Director of the ruling council, is well-known as a practical joker.

The Quarks have begun work on drilling the outer boreholes. The Doctor and Jamie are captured by a patrol of Quarks and taken to the Dominator ship for questioning and scanning. A scan of Jamie is presumed to apply to them both and to the Dulcian race as a whole, who are thus described as possible but not definite for conversion into a slave force. During an intelligence test, the Doctor feigns stupidity to prove their worthlessness. He also fails to use a weapon from the Dulcian museum, falsely claiming such military technology has been lost to the Dulcians. The Doctor and Jamie are freed as worthless idiots.

Cully has contacted his father, Director Senex, who orders him to recharge Balan’s travel capsule and use it to return to the Capital City. He takes Zoe with him to the Council Chamber, where the discussion lacks focus and purpose. Senex refuses to believe that Cully is telling the truth, despite Zoe’s protests, so Cully steals a travel pod and heads back to the island with Zoe to get proof of their story. The Doctor and Jamie take Balan’s pod to the capital city. They are angry that Cully and Zoe have been allowed to return to danger and have real trouble convincing the Council of the Dominators' threat. The true danger is only revealed when the Council obtains a visual image of a survey station destroyed by the Quarks on Toba’s instructions.

The Dominators capture Balan, Teel and Kando, using them for further tests on their species before they are made to work as slaves in the drilling sites. Zoe and Cully are also captured and enslaved but find Balan and Kando opposed to using force against the Quarks. However, they struggle to dig the borehole, with Balan collapsing. Cully sneaks back to the museum and captures a laser weapon stored there as an exhibit.

The Doctor and Jamie take control of a travel pod and return to the Island of Death. Jamie links up with Cully at the museum while the Doctor is captured by Quarks and taken with the slave force back to the Dominator ship. Cully uses the gun to destroy a Quark, prompting another of Toba’s rages. The museum is destroyed in retaliation, which infuriates Rago. He orders the Quarks to hold the Doctor and Zoe for further tests while Balan, Kando, and Teel are sent to excavate to the central bore site.

Jamie and Cully survive the explosion in a nuclear bunker below the main building. After a struggle they open a hatch above them and succeed in crushing a Quark with a boulder.  This alerts Toba who heads off to investigate how another Quark has been destroyed, leaving the Doctor and Zoe free to roam the Dominator ship. Jamie and Cully continue to attack other Quarks in a series of guerrilla raids.

The Dulcian Council debates the situation and not even Tensa, Chairman of the Emergencies Committee, can spur them into decisive action. The key moment comes when Rago himself uses the travel pod taken by the Doctor to travel to the capital with a Quark. The robot kills Tensa on command. Rago says that the fittest Dulcians will be enslaved to use on the Dominator homeworld. The rest will be left on Dulkis to die, as the planet is doomed.

Toba returns to the ship and demands to know who destroyed the Quark. Balan is killed for refusing to answer, and the Doctor is selected to die next. Rago returns and sends Toba to complete the drilling and prepare the bore rockets, using the Quarks and the Doctor, Zoe, Teel and Kando as slaves. Rago focuses on a nuclear seed device to be dropped down the central borehole. He also hears from the Fleet Leader that no Dulcian slave force is to be assembled: all the Dulcians are now to stay on the planet to die when it is destroyed.

The dig proceeds with the Doctor and the other slaves making progress, but when Toba abandons his watch post Jamie and Cully disable another Quark and free their friends. The Doctor has worked out the Dominator scheme: a nuclear fission seed will be dropped down the borehole, converting the entire planet into a radioactive mass to power the Dominator fleet. They begin digging a tunnel to the central borehole to steal the deadly device before it can detonate. Jamie and Cully help by destroying Quarks with homemade bombs.

The Doctor intercepts the seed during its descent but tells his friends that it cannot be defused. Cully, Teel and Kando are told to flee in the remaining travel pod, while Jamie and Zoe are sent to the TARDIS. The Doctor runs to the Dominator ship and  smuggles the seed on board before the craft lifts off. It departs and the Dominators’ last vision is of the seed device rolling on the floor toward them. The Doctor watches the Dominator ship being destroyed and then heads back to the TARDIS which departs in a hurry to avoid the advancing lava flows from the new volcanoes.

Production
Episode 3 had no on-screen episode number caption. The Quarks were created as an attempt to create a monster with the same merchandising potential as the popular Daleks. The pacifist Dulcians were originally conceived as a satire on the 1960s hippie subculture.

This serial was originally composed of six episodes, but it was deemed too short of content and reduced to five at the last minute. Producer Peter Bryant ordered Haisman and Lincoln to abandon writing the sixth episode and script editor Derrick Sherwin rewrote the fifth episode to provide a conclusion. Haisman and Lincoln were not informed of this, or of the BBC's merchandising of the Quarks, which led to their refusal to write for the series again. Subsequently, an additional episode had to be penned for the following The Mind Robber, also making that story five parts.

Wrotham Quarry in Addington, Kent doubles as the planet surface of Dulkis.

Patrick Troughton was absent from all of the location filming sessions. A double plays the role of the Doctor in all the location footage, his face being clearly visible in some shots.

Cast notes
Ronald Allen later played Ralph Cornish in The Ambassadors of Death (1970). Arthur Cox went on to play Mr Henderson in the 2010 episode "The Eleventh Hour". Brian Cant had previously played Kert Gantry in the story The Daleks' Master Plan (1965–66). Malcolm Terris later appeared in The Horns of Nimon (1979–80). Philip Voss had previously played Acomat in Marco Polo (1964).

Broadcast and reception

The BBC Audience Research Report for The Dominators showed that much of the sample dismissed the serial as unsurprising as it followed a known pattern, though a third felt that it was still inventive.

In The Discontinuity Guide (1995), Paul Cornell, Martin Day, and Keith Topping wrote that the serial treated the issues of the time—like hippies and unilateralism—with "disdain", and the story was also "very dull". In The Television Companion (1998), David J. Howe and Stephen James Walker called the serial "a disappointingly lacklustre start to the sixth season". They found it hard for the viewer to care about the Dulcians, but said the Dominators were "hardly amongst the best of the series' alien creations, [but] at least quite well realised on screen". In 2009, Mark Braxton of Radio Times described the serial as lazy in production with "hopeless" cliffhangers and a lack of audience identification. He wrote that the few small "saving graces" were the appearance of the Quarks and the pyrotechnics. Reviewing the serial for SFX, Ian Berriman gave The Dominators a rating of two out of five stars. He wrote that the plot did not have much and was "push-button and pedestrian", with the best thing being Troughton. DVD Talk's John Sinnott was more positive, giving the story three out of five stars. He criticised the "talky beginning" and non-frightening Quarks, but felt that it was a "wonderful romp" due to the TARDIS crew.

Commercial releases

In print

A novelisation of this serial, written by Ian Marter, was published by Target Books in April 1984.

Home media
The Dominators was released on VHS in 1990. It was released on CD on 7 May 2007, and as a DVD in the UK on 12 July 2010 and in the USA and Canada on 11 January 2011.

References

External links

Doctor Who Locations – The Dominators

Target novelisation

Doctor Who serials novelised by Ian Marter
Second Doctor serials
1968 British television episodes